Maxim Gennadievich Grishin (born 2 May 1984) is a Russian professional mixed martial artist and kickboxer who competes in the Light Heavyweight division of the Ultimate Fighting Championship. Grishin was the former M-1 Global Eastern Europe Heavyweight Champion.

Mixed martial arts career

Background

Grishin competes in the heavyweight division, despite weighing around 220 lb, a mere 15 lb over the light heavyweight weight limit. Grishin, therefore, is regarded as a small heavyweight, though he has fast striking ability.

He trains with the Red Devil Sport Club – the training facility of Fedor Emelianenko and other top Russian fighters. As part of the Red Devil Sport Club, Grishin has also trained in Stary Oskol at the St. Alexander Nevsky Sport Palace. In the build-up for his intended M-1 Global title fight against Guram Gugenishvili, Grishin trained with Kirill Sidelnikov, Dmitry Samoilov, Viktor Nemkov and Alexei Nazarov.  Unfortunately, Grishin was forced to withdraw from the bout with a knee injury that occurred during a national hand-to-hand combat fighting championship in Ufa. Consequently, M-1 Global Americas Champion Kenny Garner gained the opportunity to challenge fight Gugenishvili for the M-1 Heavyweight Challenge Title.

Early career

Grishin made his professional mixed martial arts debut against Gela Getsadze at the World Pankration Championship. After going the two-round distance, Grishin was declared the winner via unanimous decision. However, that same night, Judo ace Baga Agaev used an armbar to force Grishin to submit just 47 seconds into their match.

M-1 Global

Grishin joined M-1 Global in 2009, claiming a TKO victory in his first bout in March of that year. Grishin faced Joaquim Ferreira in Brazil soon after, but lost via north-south choke. Grishin suffered a further loss at the hands of Shane del Rosario in South Korea, defeated by TKO in just 21 seconds.

After a further two wins in the M-1 Global organisation, Grishin appeared for the Konfrontacja Sztuk Walki promotion at KSW 12, where he faced Dawid Baziak. Baziak defeated Grishin via unanimous decision.  Returning to M-1 organisation, Grishin joined their Eastern European tournament. His opening round fight was against Gadzhimurad Nurmagomedov, which Grishin won via TKO in round 1 to progress to the semi-final. There, Grishin met Arsen Abdulkerimov, again winning via TKO to reach the final.

In the final, Grishin had to face his training partner Alexander Volkov. Despite Volkov's superior record of 7–1, Grishin won the fight via rear naked choke in the opening round. Consequently, Grishin became the M-1 Global Eastern European Heavyweight Champion. As Eastern European Champion, Grishin was scheduled to face Guram Gugenishvili, the Western European Champion, for the inaugural M-1 Global Heavyweight Championship. However, a month before the fight, Grishin withdrew with a knee injury providing M-1 Selection Americas Champion Kenny Garner with an opportunity to challenge for the title.

Grishin faced Joachim Christensen on May 16, 2012 at М-1 Challenge 32 in his light heavyweight debut. He won via  unanimous decision (29–28, 29–28, 29–27). and was due to face Western Europe Champion Guram Gugenishvili for the M-1 Global heavyweight title until a knee injury forced his withdrawal.

Fight Nights
Grishin faced Rameau Thierry Sokoudjou in a kickboxing match on February 23 (Defender of the Fatherland Day), 2013 at Fight Nights 10. He won via split (29–28, 28–29, 28–29).

Grishin faced Trevor Prangley, gilling in for an injured Mike Kyle, at Fight Nights: Battle of Moscow 17 on 30 September 2014. He won the fight via TKO in the second round.

Professional Fighters League

2018 Season
Grishin made his PFL debut on June 21, 2018 at PFL 2 (2018 season) against Jason Butcher. Grishin won the fight in the first round after Butcher injured his ankle and foot after falling down. 

Grishin then faced Rakim Cleveland on August 2, 2018 at PFL 5 (2018 season). He won the bout via rear-naked choke in the second round. 

Having won both of his bouts, Grishin advanced to the Quarter-Finals, where he faced Smealinho Rama on October 13, 2018 at PFL 9 (2018 season). The bout ended in a majority draw after two rounds. However Rama advanced further in the tournament via first round tiebreaker, wherein the winner of the first round advances further.

2019 Season

Grishin appeared on the next season, marking the occasion by facing former UFC fighter Jordan Johnson on June 6, 2019 at PFL 3 (2019 season). Grishin won the fight via unanimous decision. 

Grishin faced Mikhail Mokhnatkin on August 8, 2019 at PFL 6 (2019 season). He won the fight with ease, knocking Mikhail out early in the first round. 

Having won the first two bouts of this season like last one, Grishin would rematch against Jordan Johnson in the Quarterfinals on October 31, 2019 at PFL 9 (2019 season). Just like last season, he would draw with his opponent and be eliminated via the first round tiebreaker.

Ultimate Fighting Championship
Grishin made his UFC debut as a replacement for Alexander Romanov against Marcin Tybura on July 11, 2020 at UFC 251. Grishin lost the fight via unanimous decision.

Grishin faced Gadzhimurad Antigulov on October 18, 2020 at UFC Fight Night: Ortega vs. The Korean Zombie. He won the fight via technical knockout in round two.

Grishin faced Dustin Jacoby on February 27, 2021 at UFC Fight Night: Rozenstruik vs. Gane. At the weigh-ins, Maxim Grishin weighed in at  210.5  pounds, four and a half pounds over the light heavyweight non-title fight limit of 206 pounds. His bout proceeded at a catchweight and Grishin was fined 30% of his individual purse, which went Dustin. He lost a close bout via unanimous decision. 

Grishin was scheduled to face Ovince Saint Preux on June 26, 2021 at UFC Fight Night 190.  However, Grishin withdrew from the bout due to visa issues and was replaced by Tanner Boser in a heavyweight bout.

Grishin was expected to face Ed Herman on February 12, 2022 at UFC 271. However, Herman pulled out off the bout and was replaced by William Knight. At the weigh-ins, Knight weighed in at 218 pounds, 12 pounds over the light heavyweight non-title fight limit,  marking the biggest weight miss in UFC history. As a result, the bout was shifted to heavyweight and Knight was fined 40% of his purse, which went to Grishin. Grishin won the bout via unanimous decision.

Grishin was scheduled to face Jailton Almeida on May 21, 2022 at UFC Fight Night 206. However, Grishin pulled out due to undisclosed reasons in late April. Almeida decided to move up to heavyweight and will face Parker Porter.

Grishin was scheduled to face Philipe Lins on October 1, 2022, at UFC Fight Night 211. Despite both men weighing in successfully, the bout was cancelled while the event was in progress due to an undisclosed medical issue.

The bout between Grishin and Jailton Almeida was rescheduled for UFC Fight Night 214 on November 5, 2022. On the Monday of fight week, the bout was reported scrapped from this card for unknown reasons.

Championships and Accomplishments

Mixed Martial Arts
World Fighting Championship Akhmat
WCFA Light Heavyweight Champion (one time)

M-1 Global
M-1 Selection 2010 Eastern Europe Championships.

Hand-to-hand combat
Russian Union of Martial Arts
Hand-to-hand combat Russian National Champion.

Kickboxing record

|-
|-  bgcolor="CCFFCC"
| 2015-12-26 || Win ||align=left| Stjepan Bekavac || WFCA 13: Grozny Battle 9 || Grozny, Russia || Decision (split) || 3 || 3:00 || 2-0
|-
|-  bgcolor="CCFFCC"
| 2013-02-23 || Win ||align=left| Sokoudjou || Fight Nights: Battle of Moscow 10 || Moscow, Russia || Decision (split)|| 3 || 3:00 || 1-0
|-
|-
| colspan=9 | Legend:

Mixed martial arts record

|-
|Win
|align=center|32–9–2
|William Knight
|Decision (unanimous)
|UFC 271
|
|align=center|3
|align=center|5:00
|Houston, Texas, United States
|
|-
|Loss
|align=center|31–9–2
|Dustin Jacoby
|Decision (unanimous)
|UFC Fight Night: Rozenstruik vs. Gane
|
|align=center|3
|align=center|5:00
|Las Vegas, Nevada, United States
|
|-
|Win
|align=center|31–8–2
|Gadzhimurad Antigulov
|TKO (punches)
|UFC Fight Night: Ortega vs. The Korean Zombie
|
|align=center|2
|align=center|4:58
|Abu Dhabi, United Arab Emirates
|
|-
|Loss
|align=center|30–8–2
|Marcin Tybura
|Decision (unanimous)
|UFC 251 
|
|align=center|3
|align=center|5:00
|Abu Dhabi, United Arab Emirates
|
|-
|Draw
|align=center|30–7–2
|Jordan Johnson
|Draw (majority)
|PFL 9
|
|align=center|2
|align=center|5:00
|Las Vegas, Nevada, United States
|
|-
|Win
|align=center|30–7–1
|Mikhail Mokhnatkin
|KO (punch)
|PFL 6
|
|align=center|1
|align=center|0:48
|Atlantic City, New Jersey, United States
|
|-
|Win
|align=center|29–7–1
|Jordan Johnson
|Decision (unanimous)
|PFL 3
|
|align=center| 3
|align=center| 5:00
|Long Island, New York, United States
|
|-
|Draw
|align=center|
|Smealinho Rama
|Draw (majority)
|PFL 9
|
|align=center| 2
|align=center| 5:00
|Long Beach, California, United States
|
|-
|Win
|align=center|28–7
|Rakim Cleveland
|Submission (rear-naked choke)
|PFL 5
|
|align=center|2
|align=center|4:03
|Long Island, New York, United States
|
|-
|Win
|align=center|27–7
|Jason Butcher
|TKO (leg injury)
|PFL 2
|
|align=center| 1
|align=center| 1:41
|Chicago, Illinois, United States
|
|-
|Win
|align=center|26–7
|Leonardo Guimarães
|Decision (unanimous)
|WFCA 45
|
|align=center|3
|align=center|5:00
|Grozny, Russia
|
|-
|Win
|align=center|25–7
|Dirlei Broenstrup
|Decision (unanimous)
|WFCA 42: Malyutin vs Jacarezinho
|
|align=center|3
|align=center|5:00
|Moscow, Russia
|
|-
|Win
|align=center|24–7
|Matej Batinić
|KO (head kick)
|Akhmat Fight Show 34: Battle in Moscow
|
|align=center|3
|align=center|2:43
|Moscow, Russia
|
|-
|Loss
|align=center|23–7
|Magomed Ankalaev
|TKO (punches)
|Akhmat Fight Show 30: Grand Prix Akhmat 2016 Finals
|
|align=center|4
|align=center|1:13
|Grozny, Russia
|
|-
|Win
|align=center|23–6
|Maxim Futin
|Decision (unanimous)
|Akhmat Fight Show 23: Grand Prix Akhmat 2016
|
|align=center| 3
|align=center| 5:00
|Grozny, Russia
| 
|-
|Win
|align=center|22–6
|Marcin Łazarz
|Decision (unanimous)
|Akhmat Fight Show 18: Grand Prix Akhmat 2016
|
|align=center| 3
|align=center| 5:00
|Grozny, Russia
| 
|-
|Win
|align=center|21–6
|Joaquim Ferreira
|TKO (punches)
|WFCA 9: Grozny Battle 6
|
|align=center|3
|align=center|3:06
|Grozny, Russia
|
|-
|Win
|align=center|20–6
|Malik Merad
|Submission (rear-naked choke)
|WFCA 3: Grozny Battle 3
|
|align=center|1
|align=center|4:43
|Grozny, Russia
|
|-
|Win
|align=center|19–6
|Dorian Ilić
|Submission (arm-triangle choke)
|WFCA 1: Grozny Battle 1
|
|align=center|1
|align=center|3:15
|Grozny, Russia
|
|-
|Win
|align=center|18–6
|Trevor Prangley
|TKO (punches)
|Fight Nights Global 27: Battle Of Moscow 17
|
|align=center| 2
|align=center| 2:04
|Moscow, Russia
|
|-
|Win
|align=center|17–6
|Rodney Wallace
|Decision (split)
|Driven MMA: One
|
|align=center| 3
|align=center| 5:00
|Canton, Ohio, United States
|
|-
|Win
|align=center|16–6
|Mário Miranda
|Decision (unanimous)
|Fight Nights Global 20: Battle Of Moscow 13
|
|align=center| 3
|align=center| 5:00
|Moscow, Russia
|
|-
|Win
|align=center|15–6
|Ray Lopez
|Submission (rear-naked choke)
|NAAFS: Fight Night in the Flats 9 
|
|align=center|1
|align=center|4:25
|Cleveland, Ohio, United States
|
|-
|Win
|align=center|14–6
|William Hill
|TKO (punches)
|NAAFS: Caged Vengeance 12
|
|align=center|1
|align=center|3:57
|Streetsboro, Ohio, United States
|
|-
|Win
|align=center|13–6
|Joachim Christensen
|Decision (unanimous)
|M-1 Challenge 32
|
|align=center|3
|align=center|5:00
|Moscow, Russia
|
|-
|Loss
|align=center|12–6
|Kenny Garner
|TKO (submission to punches)
|M-1 Challenge 27
|
|align=center|5
|align=center|4:07
|Phoenix, Arizona, United States
|
|-
|Win
|align=center|12–5
|Júlio Cézar de Lima
|TKO (punches)
|League S-70: Russia vs. Brazil
|
|align=center|1
|align=center|1:22
|Sochi, Russia
|
|-
|Win
|align=center|11–5
|Alan Sobanov
|KO (punch)
|SMMAI: Tornado
|
|align=center|1
|align=center|3:30
|Sochi, Russia
|
|-
|Win
|align=center|10–5
|Samir Akhmetov
|TKO (punches)
|Sochi MMA International
|
|align=center|1
|align=center|1:43
|Sochi, Russia
|
|-
|Win
|align=center|9–5
|Stanislav Mirzamagomedov
|Submission (arm-triangle choke)
|MFT: Fedor Emelianenko Cup
|
|align=center|1
|align=center|2:32
|Nizhny Novgorod, Russia
|
|-
|Win
|align=center|8–5
|Vladimir Kuchenko
|TKO (leg kick and punches)
|M-1 Challenge 25
|
|align=center|3
|align=center|3:14
|Saint Petersburg, Russia
|
|-
|Loss
|align=center|7–5
|Guram Gugenishvili
|Submission (rear-naked choke)
|M-1 Challenge 23
|
|align=center|1
|align=center|3:38
|Moscow, Russia
|
|-
|Win
|align=center|7–4
|Alexander Volkov
|Submission (rear-naked choke)
|M-1 Selection 2010: Eastern Europe Finals
|
|align=center| 1
|align=center| 2:39
|Moscow, Russia
|
|-
|Win
|align=center|6–4
|Arsen Abdulkerimov
|TKO (punches)
|M-1 Selection 2010: Eastern Europe Round 3
|
|align=center| 1
|align=center| 1:52
|Kyiv, Ukraine
|
|-
|Win
|align=center|5–4
|Gadzhimurad Nurmagomedov
|TKO (punches)
|M-1 Selection 2010: Eastern Europe Round 2
|
|align=center|1
|align=center|2:05
|Kyiv, Ukraine
|
|-
|Loss
|align=center|4–4
|Dawid Baziak
|Decision (unanimous)
|KSW 12
|
|align=center|3
|align=center|3:00
|Warsaw, Poland
|
|-
|Win
|align=center|4–3
|Levan Persaev
|TKO (knee)
|M-1 Challenge 20: 2009 Finals
|
|align=center|1
|align=center|1:56
|Saint Petersburg, Russia
|
|-
|Win
|align=center|3–3
|Dmitry Zabolotny
|TKO (punches)
|M-1 Challenge: 2009 Selections 7
|
|align=center|1
|align=center|N/A
|Moscow, Russia
|
|-
|Loss
|align=center|2–3
|Shane del Rosario
|TKO (punches)
|M-1 Challenge 17
|
|align=center|1
|align=center|0:21
|Seoul, South Korea
|
|-
|Loss
|align=center|2–2
|Joaquim Ferreira
|Submission (north-south choke)
|M-1 Challenge 15
|
|align=center|1
|align=center|3:57
|São Paulo, Brazil
|
|-
|Win
|align=center|2–1
|Magomed Umarov
|TKO (punches)
|M-1 Challenge: 2009 Selections 1
|
|align=center|1
|align=center|N/A
|Saint Petersburg, Russia
|
|-
|Loss
|align=center|1–1
|Baga Agaev
|Submission (armbar)
|rowspan="2"|WAFC: World Pankration Championship 2008
|rowspan="2"|
|align=center|1
|align=center|0:47
|rowspan="2"|Khabarovsk Krai, Russia
|
|-
|Win
|align=center|1–0
|Gela Getsadze
|Decision (unanimous)
|align=center|2
|align=center|5:00
|

See also 
 List of current UFC fighters
 List of male mixed martial artists

References

External links 
  
  

1984 births
Living people
Light heavyweight mixed martial artists
Ultimate Fighting Championship male fighters
Russian male mixed martial artists
Mixed martial artists utilizing ARB
Mixed martial artists utilizing boxing
Russian male kickboxers
Heavyweight kickboxers
People from Vyazma
Sportspeople from Smolensk Oblast